Wyoming is a city in Kent County in the U.S. state of Michigan.  The population was 76,501 at the 2020 census. Wyoming is the second most-populated community in the Grand Rapids metropolitan area and is bordered by Grand Rapids on the northeast. After Grand Rapids, it is also the second most-populated city in West Michigan.

The area was the second location in Kent County settled by European-Americans in 1832 on the edges of Buck Creek and was organized as Wyoming Township in 1848 when it was set off from the northern half of Byron Township. Through the 1800s and into the early 1900s, Wyoming served as a rural area providing goods to Grand Rapids, though with the introduction of the Grand Rapids, Holland and Chicago Railway, the township experienced suburbanization. After Grandville separated from the township in 1933 and Wyoming experienced more growth with the opening of the General Motors Stamping Division Plant, Wyoming was engaged in annexation conflicts with Grand Rapids and Grandville until the township became incorporated as the city of Wyoming in 1959.

After obtaining cityhood, Wyoming served as an entertainment and retail destination on the 28th Street corridor with the opening of Rogers Plaza and Studio 28. Into the 1980s, the quality of development in Wyoming began to falter and with the 1999 opening of RiverTown Crossings in Grandville, retail businesses in the city were upended. Development in Wyoming then shifted towards the southwest panhandle near RiverTown Crossings in the early 21st century and has continued in the area surrounding Metro Health Hospital following its opening in 2007, though General Motors closed the stamping plant two years later in 2009.

History

Native American settlements 

The Norton Mound group was the center of a Goodall focus Hopewellian culture in the area, from ca. 400 B.C. to A.D. 400, with the mounds probably being constructed in the first century AD. Odawa tribes were established in the area near present-day Wyoming, with the village of the ogema Black Skin, natively known as Muck-i-ta-oska or Mukatasha, ranging from the southwest present-day Grand Rapids to the Grand River across from the Norton Mound group, with the mouth of the Black Skin Creek leading into the Grand River across from the mounds. Where what is now Grandville, Michigan, a prairie existed west of Wyoming where up to ten native families under the ogema As-to-quet, who was friendly with early settlers in the area, held planting grounds.

Little Prairie settlement 
In the late 1700s, French fur traders traversed the Grand River Valley. Lucius Lyon, a Yankee Protestant, was contracted by the federal government to survey the Grand River Valley in the fall of 1830 and in the first quarter of 1831, the federal survey of the Northwest Territory reached the Grand River, setting the boundaries for Kent County, named after prominent New York jurist James Kent. Lyon would also survey "Township Nº VI West, Range Nº XII North", which would become Wyoming. The area that is now the city of Wyoming was the second location settled by European-Americans in Kent County. Robert Howlett, Luther Lincoln, Amos Gordon and Stephen Tucker were some of the first settlers in the fall of 1832. Gordon left Wayne County, Michigan to arrive at the mission in Grand Rapids to build the first mill at Indian Mill Creek, later leading a scouting group of Howlett, Lincoln and Tucker in birch canoes down the Grand River in the summer of 1832. The group found a Buck Creek emptying into the Grand, determining the creek was strong enough for a mill, with many of Wyoming's first settlers establishing themselves near the creek.

Lincoln built the first log shanty in the area in the fall of 1832 and began to prepare his plot with livestock and crops before the winter. Lincoln and Tucker would stay at the mission through the winter; Tucker and Native Americans later constructed the first established house for his family in March 1833. Lincoln's cabin, however, was built in close proximity to the Norton Mounds and was likely burned down by Odawa natives according to settler Roswell Britton. The first settlers had a successful harvest, constructing gristmills and sawmills on Buck Creek a year in 1833 and by April 1834, a community called "Little Prairie" had been established. On May 24, 1834, the first post office was established at Little Prairie. In 1835, competing lumber mills on Buck Creek that supplied wood to Chicago – one owned by Albert and Joh Bull and the other by Nathanial Brown – starved the water flow to Gordon's mill, resulting with Gordon building a new mill on what is now the southwest corner of 44th Street and Burlingame Avenue. Through the 1800s, Wyoming would primarily remain an agricultural location and its development occurred near transportation routes in the region.

Byron Township (1836–1848)
The boundaries of Township 5 North, Range 12 West and Township 6 North, Range 12 West, surveyed by Lyon, were consolidated and designated to be organized as Byron Township in 1835 by the Michigan Territorial Legislature. In late 1835, the first wedding occurred between Sylvester Hills and Harriet Burton. The town was first organized as Byron Township on May 2, 1836, was called "Oakesville" as it was headquartered at the home of Charles H. Oakes, though when Oakes moved to the Upper Peninsula of Michigan, the name was changed to Grandville. It was this year that one of Wyoming's most notable pioneers, Justus Charles Rogers, established his homestead on what is now the southwest corner of 28th Street and Clyde Park Avenue. A framed house was constructed by Rogers in the spring of 1836 and was expected to accept his wife upon their return, though the home was discovered destroyed by a tornado in September 1836 when they returned.

The following year in 1837, the launch of the pole boat propelled by a quant, the Cinderella, was celebrated as a major development for the town. The first story of what would become Rogers Mansion was then constructed in 1837, with the second story being finished in 1839. For three weeks, settlers had to live without flour and late in the year, the first metal casting occurred at the Jame McCray foundry. In 1839, the township's final land patents south of the Grand River were issued for plots near the salt springs adjacent to the Norton Mounds and Section 16. Plaster Creek first powered plaster operations in the township in 1841 on land leased by Daniel Ball from De Garmo Jones. In May 1843, Gordon died in Plainfield Township, Michigan.

Wyoming Township (1848–1959)
On April 3, 1848, the  township of Byron divided in half during, with the name of Wyoming being used for the northern  portion where the majority of the population was settled. with many settling near Buck Creek. At the time of division, about 500 people lived in Wyoming while a little less than 200 lived in Byron. The name came from the Wyoming County, New York from which the majority of the residents came during the first 16 years. During the Great Famine in Ireland, Irish immigrants began to appear in Wyoming in 1849, with the Whalen family being among the first Irish families in the township. Michael Avenue is named after Michael Whalen. Dutch immigrants arrived in greater numbers and created agricultural cooperatives on smaller parcels of land, creating closed groups among themselves. In 1850, the population of Wyoming Township was counted at 543 people. At the time, Dutch and Irish immigrants were scapegoated for the prevalence of "Michigan ague", or malaria, which had begun affecting the area.

Fisher's Station 

David Fisher arrived in Wyoming in 1857 and acquired land from Gordon's estate, replacing Gordon's old Buck Creek mill, which had burned down, and built a replacement. Fisher would then construct cabins along the west side of Burlingame Avenue which housed Fisher and the millers he employed. Operations for Fisher would expand further south on Buck Creek where he would extract lime and peat, later building a second mill on a plot of land he purchased from William Ferry in the southeast portion of the township. In 1869 a station on the Grand Rapids and Indiana Railroad was constructed and in 1870, Fisher had a town platted called "Fisher's Station", which would develop around the railroad station. A post office was constructed in 1871 and the area was platted in December 1873. The population of Wyoming Township grew to 2,008 in 1874 while the population of Fisher's Station was 65 in 1888. Fisher, along with his brother and business partner James, would retire in Grand Rapids and lived as wealthy men for the rest of their lives. During the township's early history, the then rural community would often produce agricultural goods and travel to Grand Rapids to sell their products.

Suburban growth 
Gypsum mines in northeast Wyoming along Plaster Creek occurred for decades and became more refined in 1880 when the Alabastine Company acquired much of the gypsum, later opening the Alabastine Mine in 1907. began to grow as a suburb of Grand Rapids in 1890 with the city's next major area of development occurring in the northeast section of the township closest to Grand Rapids with much of the city's population moving southward in the early 1900s. The City of Grand Rapids started annexing portions of the township and by 1891 had annexed one square mile of the city from Division to Clyde Park and from Hall to Burton. In 1902, the Grand Rapids, Holland and Chicago Railway promoted the creation of more plats in the Galewood, Urbandale and Burlingame (GUB) neighborhoods, with the railway providing transportation to downtown Grand Rapids in fifteen minutes. From 1890 to 1906, thirty-two plats were in the GUB neighborhoods with communities bordering Grand Rapids developing into suburban areas where Dutch Americans predominately resided. In the GUB area, the Christian Reformed Church expanded with its Dutch churchgoers. Another section of Wyoming was annexed by Grand Rapids in 1916 that involved half-mile from Burton to Alger and from Clyde Park to Division.

The growth of Wyoming saw the emergence of profitable businesses in Wyoming, including the Leonard Refrigerator Company, the Pierre Marquette railroad car repair shop and gypsum mines. Gravel pits operated by Grand Rapids Gravel Company lined the western side of present-day Byron Center Avenue from 28th Street (then Beales Road) in the south to the north near Lamar Park – its nearby lakes being former pits – also provided jobs and gravel for roads in the expanding township. With the United States entering World War I, the federal government began construction of a picric acid on the west side of 44th Street and Clyde Park Avenue, employing thousands of people in the area and attracting others after rumors of an airplane factory on the site were spread, though construction would end following the Armistice of 11 November 1918. In the late 1910s and early 1920s in the GUB neighborhood, Hackett and later Lorraine automobiles were manufactured at a factory on Beverly and Burlingame Avenues.

Into the 1920s, Wyoming saw its population nearly triple, experiencing its period of largest growth, with city officials accustomed to rural affairs being overwhelmed with new developments, taking on tasks and issues as they occurred. Farmers in Wyoming began to sell their farms for development as prices for their produce declined, with farming families either assuming jobs in Grand Rapids or leaving the area. Since Wyoming did not have adequate zoning regulations like neighboring Grand Rapids, land speculators began the platting of small, cheap residential properties, especially the neighborhoods of Godwin Heights, Home Acres, Wyoming Park and along Division Avenue, with plat proposals occurring during every town meeting at the time. Materials from the cancelled picric acid plant were taken and used to construct some of these cheap houses, which had tarpaper roofs and lacked basements. The construction of these affordable home developments in Wyoming provided a cheap workforce for Grand Rapids. Citizens already established in the Grand Rapids and Wyoming area deplored the new residents who moved to the Home Acres and Division corridor, referring to the area as "Shanty Town" and as a place of crime. White Protestants in Wyoming also prevented African Americans from residing in the township, engaging in housing segregation and redlining, with some sales agreements explicitly stating that a property "shall never be occupied by a negro", extending such agreements to second parties, heirs and others. As a result of suburbanization the population of Wyoming had about 200% between 1920 and 1930, from 5,702 to 16,931 and the unorganized zoning of the township would cause issues for Wyoming throughout its future.

With Wyoming developing at such a rapid pace, the Grand Rapids city officials and affiliated business leaders attempted to deter the development of industry in Wyoming, fearing that Grand Rapids would lose skilled workers and wages would increase. One major incident of Grand Rapids preventing industrial development in Wyoming occurred in the early-1920s when Ford Motor Company attempted to purchase the unfinished picric acid factory that was being constructed during World War I. Kendall Furniture quickly purchased the property before Ford could acquire the site, later selling the property to repay back taxes.

Great Depression and General Motors 
As the Great Depression affected the world's economy in the 1930s, Grand Rapids saw little industrial development as there was no demand for luxury furniture, the city's main economic product. During the economic depression, the cheap furniture laborers residing in Wyoming were laid off and at least twenty-five percent of citizens were unemployed. Wyoming teachers took a 45% pay cut and children had to share textbooks in school. A poor fund was established in 1931, though by September 1932, the $44,000 collected – the  – was insufficient for the project. Small construction projects by the township provided some funds for residents, though they were only temporary measures, with tax deadline extensions from the township becoming common throughout the Great Depression as individuals could not afford to pay taxes. By mid-1933, about 20% of Wyoming's workforce was unemployed.

During the depression, many residents of Wyoming grew disillusioned with the existing unchecked capitalism, small government practices and the laissez-faire economic system that relied on local governments, churches and charities to provide to care for citizens. When President Franklin D. Roosevelt introduced the New Deal and federal social welfare programs – including the Civil Works Administration, Public Works Administration and Federal Emergency Relief Administration – to the United States, city residents strongly approved of these actions by his government. It was reported that men in Wyoming were grateful and wept when they were told that they would have a job for the first time in years as a result of Roosevelt's welfare programs. Roosevelt's program helped Wyoming pay workers to construct new bridges, parks, roads, schools and sewers, with Ideal Park, Johnson Park and the first township office being constructed with federal funding.

Former Mayor of Grand Rapids George P. Tilma was elected supervisor of Wyoming Township in 1932 and was tasked with modernizing the developing suburban community from a rural town system. In 1933, Grandville was separated from Wyoming and was established as its own city. In the winter of 1933, Tilma was also able to circumvent the Emergency Banking Act in a technically act to purchase 555 tons of coal that was distributed to the poor to heat their homes. General Motors sought to construct a new facility in Grand Rapids, though there were no areas for development or future expansions, so the cities of Grand Rapids and Wyoming collaborated to have General Motors purchase land in Wyoming while Grand Rapids supplied utilities to the site. Tilma's expertise was instrumental in both secretly negotiating with Grand Rapids on utility work and with obtaining approval of the site by General Motors. The General Motors plant began construction on January 22, 1936 and Roosevelt's New Deal funding helped construct the sewer and water system for the factory.

Following the construction of the General Motors stamping plant, development on Division Avenue increased extensively, with a new Kelloggsville High School being opened in September 1936 and a new Godwin Heights High School being approved in January 1937. Supervisor Tilma died suddenly in his office in April 1937 with his death being attributed to an intracerebral hemorrhage. As World War II began, Reynolds Metals opened a plant in the township that was initially to develop airplane material in 1942.

Post-war growth, push towards cityhood 
Following World War II, Wyoming developed so rapidly that mobile homes began to appear on vacant properties throughout the city, with an ordinance being passed in 1947 to prevent this. In 1946, General Motors Diesel Equipment Division , which was later known as Delphi Automotive and today known as GM Components Holdings, began operations in an area of  that was former swampland which was drained for a muck farm.

As Wyoming moved towards cityhood, the township purchased  of land from Judy Devine in December 1947 on the northeast corner of 28th Street and DeHoop Avenue, establishing the area as the town center of Wyoming due to the increased development on 28th Street. A year later in 1948, Lake Alexander was drained and converted into what is now Jackson Park. In May 1948, a committee was created by the township which recommended incorporating Wyoming into a city. As Wyoming pursued incorporation, Grand Rapids increased annexation attempts, with the annexation of GUB being defeated in April 1949.

The 1950s was the decade of Wyoming's fastest development, with homes developing so quickly that the township experienced difficulties providing proper utilities to homes. Multiple wells were drilled throughout the area to provide water to the developing community after the water supply from Grand Rapids was discontinued, temporarily sparking political controversy surrounding water supplies. The township board approved of a route for U.S. Route 131 through Wyoming in July 1952 and 28th Street was widened from two to four lanes shortly after. In August 1956, a vote for incorporation into a city was narrowly defeated and the Ivanrest area was annexed by Grandville. Rogers Department Store, one of the largest department stores in Michigan at the time, opened on 28th Street in 1955. On November 6, 1958, voters approved the incorporation of Wyoming into a city.

City of Wyoming (1959–present)

Entertainment and retail destination 
In the 1960s, the city was able to launch several projects. The first was a sewage plant to take care of issues from the state in regards to dumping it in the Buck Creek and Grand River. The next was the completion of the Water Plant in Holland with a pipeline to the city.

New developments occurred over the decade on 28th Street, with free vehicle parking drawing some shoppers away from Grand Rapids. One major project was Rogers Plaza, which opened in August 1961 as the first indoor shopping mall in Michigan and one of the first in the United States, including stores such as S. S. Kresge, W. T. Grant, Kroger, A&P, Cunningham Drug and Montgomery Ward. The neighboring Wyoming Village Mall opened later in 1961 and was anchored by Wurzburg's. Flowerland Fruitbasket also opened in 1961 providing lawn care tools, flowers and outdoor furniture for the developing suburban homes. Gordon Food Service moved from Grand Rapids to Wyoming in 1962. Three annexation attempts by Grand Rapids were also defeated in that year; the Kent County Airport, the Blackburn neighborhood and Buchanan neighborhood.

Studio 28 opened on the 28th Street corridor in 1965 and expanded in size over decades into the world's first multiplex and the largest multiplex in the world in 1988. In July 1966, the Lake Michigan pipeline to Wyoming began to supply water to the city, a major accomplishment after years of difficulties with low-quality wells. By the end of the decade, the city faced fund shortages and multiple income tax proposals were turned down. Wyoming began to establish many municipal facilities in the 1970s, including a public works building, a centralized fire station, a combined Police-Justice building and a new public library. By the 1980s, the city became concerned about the quality of developments, with adult bookstores and massage parlors appearing. In 1990, Reynolds Metals closed their operations in the city.

Great Recession and redevelopment 
After over a decade of negotiations with the City of Grandville, including a promise by the developer to not build into Wyoming, Rivertown Crossings Mall opened in 1999 near the southwest border of Wyoming, many commercial tenants left the 28th Street corridor. In response, Wyoming unveiled a redevelopment plan for their city center that they hoped would revitalize businesses on the 28th Street corridor. For Rogers Plaza, the exterior was remodel and the former Montgomery Ward anchor store was demolished and replaced with a Family Fare supermarket. A street was also planned to stretch from Rogers Plaza across Michael Avenue to Wyoming Village mall and further down to Studio 28, with commercial and apartment developments anticipated. The owners of Wyoming Village Mall ultimately disagreed with plans to tear down a portion of their building to develop the street.

The once-popular Rogers Department Store closed in 2003. More business was lost in the late-2000s into the 2010s during the great recession, with the GM Fisher Body Plant closing in 2009 due to budget cuts by General Motors. Much of the commercial atmosphere of 28th Street also dwindled down, with Studio 28 closing in 2008 and vacancy rates up to nearly 40% in 2011.

In the mid-2010s, development spread to southern Wyoming. Gordon Foods expanded its headquarters in 2012 and development occurred near the recently built Metro Health Hospital. The 28 West plan was also initiated to make 28th Street a more pedestrian-friendly corridor while also centralizing the development of food, retail and entertainment projects in the city's center, effectively creating a downtown area. 28 West Place Street, a street similar to Wyoming's 2002 proposal, was approved by the city and Wyoming Mall's owners in 2016, opening to the public in October 2017. In 2019, Magnus Capital Partners was approved to construct apartments, named HOM Flats at 28 West, with the first residents moving into their homes in early 2020.

In 2022, Franklin Partners purchased the former land of the General Motors plant, known as Site 36, from the City of Wyoming for $5.25 million and was in development discussions with four local companies and a few entities based outside of Michigan.

Geography

The city is situated southwest of Grand Rapids and south of the Grand River. Buck Creek spans across the city and created a valley of dark loam soil that was used for historically used for farming, while elevated land above the valley is dense clay soil. In the northern area of Wyoming just south of the Grand River, pockets of gravel and gypsum also exist. Some areas in Wyoming had caverns and sinkholes in the past, possibly created by water pockets eroding limestone and sandstone, though most of these features have likely collapsed due to their volatility.

Major highways
  runs along the northwestern edge of the city.
  passes briefly though the northwest corner of the city.
  runs north–south though the center of the city. 
  runs along a small portion of the southern edge of the city.
  runs west–east through the center of the city.

Climate

Economy
As of the 2000 census, there are presently 10 types of industries in the city. Manufacturing accounts for 30%, retail 16%, education, health, and social services 15%, with the next five industries accounting for 6%, and transportation, warehousing, utilities accounting for 3% of business in the city. The manufacturing segment is unique in that it is the largest in West Michigan. It currently produces auto parts, industrial machinery, commercial printing, plastics, food processing, electronics, tool and dies, concrete supplies, and fire engines.

After Grandville allowed development of a new 6-anchor shopping complex, Rivertown Crossings Mall, and the related development, many major retail businesses in Wyoming folded, including long-standing Roger's Department Store, its successor, and most tenants of Rogers Plaza.  The city of Wyoming formed a Downtown Development Authority in an effort to help support the city in keeping businesses in the area in 1999.

In the 2000s, plans were being made to revitalize the 28th Street corridor. In 2013, the City of Wyoming introduced the 28 West plan, a plan to develop downtown Wyoming along 28th Street into a more pedestrian friendly environment that will provide food, retail and entertainment. In June 2016, plans began moving forward on the 28 West plan with the demolishing of part of the Wyoming Village Mall and the creation of a new road through the surrounding parking lots to attract developers.

Largest employers

According to the city's 2021 Comprehensive Annual Financial Report, the largest employers in the city are:

Arts and culture

The parks department has been active in the past decade in redeveloping the parks in the city. Many parks have been rebuilt which included adding new equipment, splash pads, and facilities. They have also added a few new facilities including a small skateboard park near one of the highest densities of the city. The city also offers a Senior Center that provides activities for the older citizens of the city and the region as a whole. Along with the parks is the Kent Trails system that converted abandoned rail lines to bike paths. It is a collaborative effort between multiple local governments. The most recent addition to the Wyoming Park System is the Dog Park located next to Marquette Park at the very northern edge of the city. It is a privately funded park with access controls to restrict usage to registered members.

In 2002, the new Wyoming Public Library was built and is owned by the city but run by the Kent District Library System. It is a  facility with over 112,046 items. The library branch is also the highest attended in the Kent District system with 670,842 items checked out and 439,599 visits in 2009. The library currently has around 76% of the population holding a card to use the facility. The building houses the Wyoming Historical Commission that provides history of the city. Along with Historical Commission room, it houses the library for the blind and an art gallery.

Starting in 2005, the Wyoming-Kentwood Chamber of Commerce put together the 28th Street Metro Cruise that draws in automobile enthusiasts from the region. It currently spans  from its start in Grandville at Wilson and 28th where drivers gather and drive to the cruise's end in Cascade Township. The cruise runs on Friday and Saturday on the last weekend of August.

Religion 

Christian Reformed Dutch settlers established the first churches in Wyoming, with Grandville Avenue Christian Reformed Church being founded in 1891, with the church now being part of The Potter's House school. Holy Name of Jesus Catholic Church was created in 1908, serving as the place of worship for Roman Catholics in Wyoming. The episcopal population established the Holy Trinity Episcopal Church at an old chicken coop in 1957. The Assemblies of God established a church in 1929 and moved to their current location on 44th Street in 1977, with the facility being able to seat 1,400 people.

Demographics

2020 census

Note: the US Census treats Hispanic/Latino as an ethnic category. This table excludes Latinos from the racial categories and assigns them to a separate category. Hispanics/Latinos can be of any race.

2010 census
As of the census of 2010, there were 72,125 people, 26,970 households, and 18,128 families residing in the city. The racial makeup of the city was 75.8% White, 7.2% African American, 0.6% Native American, 2.8% Asian, 9.6% from other races, and 3.8% from two or more races. Hispanic or Latino of any race were 19.4% of the population.

There were 26,970 households, of which 37.2% had children under the age of 18 living with them, 47.1% were married couples living together, 14.4% had a female householder with no husband present, 5.7% had a male householder with no wife present, and 32.8% were non-families. 25.6% of all households were made up of individuals, and 7.3% had someone living alone who was 65 years of age or older. The average household size was 2.66 and the average family size was 3.22.

The median age in the city was 32.1 years. 27.1% of residents were under the age of 18; 10.5% were between the ages of 18 and 24; 29.9% were from 25 to 44; 23.5% were from 45 to 64; and 9% were 65 years of age or older. The gender makeup of the city was 49.3% male and 50.7% female.

2000 census
As of the census of 2000, there were 69,368 people, 26,536 households, and 17,540 families residing in the city. The racial makeup of the city was 84.32% White, 4.85% African American, 0.59% Native American, 2.92% Asian, 0.04% Pacific Islander, 4.70% from other races, and 2.59% from two or more races. Hispanic or Latino of any race were 9.66% of the population.

There were 26,536 households, out of which 35.7% had children under the age of 18 living with them, 49.6% were married couples living together, 12.0% had a female householder with no husband present, and 33.9% were non-families. 26.6% of all households were made up of individuals, and 7.4% had someone living alone who was 65 years of age or older. The average household size was 2.60 and the average family size was 3.19.

In the city, the population was spread out, with 28.0% under the age of 18, 10.9% from 18 to 24, 33.7% from 25 to 44, 18.0% from 45 to 64, and 9.4% who were 65 years of age or older. The median age was 31 years. For every 100 females, there were 97.5 males. For every 100 females age 18 and over, there were 95.0 males.

The median income for a household in the city was $43,164, and the median income for a family was $50,002. Males had a median income of $35,772 versus $25,482 for females. The per capita income for the city was $19,287. About 5.1% of families and 7.3% of the population were below the poverty line, including 8.8% of those under age 18 and 6.9% of those age 65 or over.

Government

The city has a council-manager government with both an elected mayor and an appointed city manager. Currently, Kent Vanderwood serves as Wyoming's mayor after defeating Sam Bolt in the 2022 election. The city council is composed of six members: three at-large and a representative from each of the three wards. The current council members are:  John Fitzgerald, Renee Hill, Robert Arnoys, Sheldon DeKryger (1st Ward), Marissa Postler (2nd Ward), and Rob Postema (Mayor Pro-Tem). Meetings are held at the City Hall on the first and third Mondays of every month. Work sessions are held the second Monday of each month.

Politics 
The first documentation of political parties in Wyoming was during the 1894 United States elections, with the majority of votes in the city supporting the Republican Party. Wyoming used a caucus election system that was frequently plagued with ballot stuffing until the township switched to a primary election system in 1928. Republican support was strong in Wyoming until the Great Depression  when Democratic Party candidate Franklin D. Roosevelt was elected President of the United States in the 1932 United States presidential election. Prior to this, only Republican candidates would run for office in Wyoming, though in 1933 elections, members of the Communist Party USA and Democrats entered as candidates, with one Democrat being elected into local office. The Communist Party would make its last run for local office in 1935. In 1937, voters in then Wyoming Township elected its first Democratic supervisor, Herman Wierenga. In Wyoming's 1954 elections, citizens voted Democrats into every office, with the Democratic Party maintaining a strong position in the city since then.

Following the 2020 United States presidential election, MLive reported in 2022 that mayor-elect Kent Vanderwood was included among a Michigan contingent of Republicans allegedly involved in the Trump fake electors plot, reportedly organized as one of the attempts to overturn the 2020 United States presidential election in favor of incumbent President Donald Trump. In January 2023, former member of the Michigan House of Representatives, Tommy Brann, was appointed by the city council to be councilmember-at-large.

Public safety

On September 30, 2007, Metro Health Hospital moved from southeast Grand Rapids to its current location on the south central section of Wyoming. Spectrum Health and St. Mary's also have urgent care centers located in Wyoming with their hospitals located in downtown Grand Rapids.

The Wyoming Police Department has over eighty sworn police officers serving as of 2013. In 2014, Wyoming Police Department and Wyoming Fire Department amalgamated their administrative offices into the Police Headquarters building, creating the new entity of Wyoming Department of Public Safety.

Education

Currently the city is served by 8 school districts. In the southwest panhandle is served by Grandville Public Schools, the south extension of the city by Metro Health is served by Byron Center Public Schools, the central part is served by Wyoming Public Schools, the southeast is served by Kelloggsville Public Schools, the area south of 56th St and East of the railroad tracks is served by Kentwood Public Schools, a small annexed section by Hall St and Freeman Ave is served by Grand Rapids Public Schools, the northeast is served by Godwin Heights Public Schools, and finally the northern section of the city is served by Godfrey-Lee Public Schools.

Of the eight districts only 4—Grandville Public Schools—does not have the majority of the buildings in the city. Grand Rapids Public Schools, Kentwood Public Schools and Byron Center Public Schools do not have any schools in the City of Wyoming. The remaining have 13 elementary schools, 3 out of 13 middle schools, 4 out of 8 high schools, with Godfrey-Lee providing a combination middle high school in the city.

The Potter's House, a Christian K-12 school, maintains its high school campus in Wyoming. Holy Trinity Lutheran School is a Pre-K-8 grade school of the Wisconsin Evangelical Lutheran Synod in Wyoming.

The city is also served for college by Grand Rapids Community College in downtown Grand Rapids. In Allendale, northwest of the city, is Grand Valley State University. Further universities can be found in Lansing, Big Rapids, and Kalamazoo. Also located in the immediate area is Hope College in Holland, Davenport University in Caledonia Township, Calvin College on the east side of Grand Rapids, Aquinas College also on the east side of Grand Rapids, Cornerstone University on the northeast side of Grand Rapids, along with Grace Bible College in the city as well. The Protestant Reformed Theological Seminary located in 4949 West Ivanrest Ave Wyoming, Michigan.

Infrastructure

Public transit
The city is part of the Grand Rapids-based Interurban Transit Partnership, called the Rapid. It currently runs Routes 1, 3, 8, 10, 16, 24, 28, and 44 in the city; that is 8 out of the 26 routes. Currently the U.S. Department of Transportation is funding a good portion of a new transit system for the area. It will run along Division Avenue on the east side of the city from its southernmost point to the downtown. It is a bus rapid transit system with only 5 projected stations on the route inside of the city. The new line will be run by the Rapid.

Utilities
Currently the city provides water and sewer to the majority of the citizens. Electricity is supplied by Consumers Energy with natural gas nominally supplied by DTE Energy. Garbage service is supplied by individual contractors to home owners and by law they are required to use the county incinerator although the city does provide a yard waste drop off center. For both phone and cable service is supported by both AT&T and Comcast. Cell phones carriers are on the whole fully supported with a number of towers.

Notable people
 Chris Kaman, professional basketball player
 Buster Mathis, professional boxer
 Buster Mathis Jr., professional boxer
 Drew Neitzel, professional basketball player

References

Bibliography

External links
 City of Wyoming official website

Cities in Kent County, Michigan
Grand Rapids metropolitan area
1848 establishments in Michigan
Populated places established in 1848